Yeongju is a city in the far north region of North Gyeongsang province in South Korea, covering 668.84 km2 with a population of 113,930 people according to the 2008 census. The city borders Bonghwa county to the east, Danyang county of North Chungcheong province to the west, Andong city and Yecheon county to the south, and Yeongwol county of Gangwon province to the north.

Buseoksa Temple in Yeongju is outstanding as a representative temple of the Avatamsaka Sect of Silla Buddhism.  Sosu Seowon is the first Seowon (Confucian academy) to have had national financial support by way of tax exemptions.

Yeongju is also home to a large Novelis Aluminum plant, employing approximately 1000 workers.  This plant provides flat-rolled aluminum sheet products to customers throughout Asia.

Administrative divisions

Yeongju is divided into nineteen primary divisions: one eup or town, nine myeon or township, and nine dong.

The eup and myeon are further divided into numerous ri or village.

Transportation
Yeongju connected by highway with these routes:
 Jungang Expressway to Busan, Daegu
 National Route 5
 National Route 28 to Yeongcheon, Gyeongju, Pohang
 National Route 36 to Boryeong, Gongju, Sejong, Cheongju, Chungju, Jecheon

Rail service to Yeongju Station is also available, and is located on the Jungang Line, the Yeongdong Line and the Gyeongbuk Line.

Climate
Yeongju has a humid continental climate (Köppen: Dwa), but can be considered a borderline humid subtropical climate (Köppen: Cwa) using the  isotherm.

Gallery

Twin towns – sister cities

Yeongju is twinned with:
 Bozhou, China
 Fujinomiya, Japan
 Jining, China
 Nantou, Taiwan
 Shaoguan, China

See also
 List of cities in South Korea
 Geography of South Korea
 People Power Party (South Korea)

References

External links

City government website

 
Cities in North Gyeongsang Province